The Battle of Queenston Heights was the first major battle in the War of 1812. Resulting in a British victory, it took place on 13 October 1812 near Queenston, Upper Canada (now Ontario).

The battle was fought between United States regulars with New York militiamen, led by Major General Stephen Van Rensselaer, and British regulars, York and Lincoln militiamen, and Mohawk warriors, led by Major General Isaac Brock and then Major General Roger Hale Sheaffe, who took command after Brock was killed.

The battle was fought as the result of an American attempt to establish a foothold on the Canadian side of the Niagara River before campaigning ended with the onset of winter. The decisive battle was the culmination of a poorly-managed American offensive and may be most historically significant for the loss of the British commander.

Despite their numerical advantage and the wide dispersal of British forces defending against their invasion attempt, the Americans, who were stationed in Lewiston, New York, were unable to get the bulk of their invasion force across the Niagara River because of the work of British artillery and the reluctance on the part of the undertrained and inexperienced American militia. As a result, British reinforcements arrived, defeated the unsupported American forces, and forced them to surrender.

Background
The United States invasion across the Niagara River was originally intended to be part of a four-pronged attack on Upper Canada's border strongpoints. From west to east, Brigadier General William Hull would attack Amherstburg through Detroit, Major General Van Rensselaer would attack across the Niagara River, another diversionary attack would cross the St. Lawrence River to take Kingston, and Major General Henry Dearborn, the commander in chief of the United States Army, would make the major attack via Lake Champlain to capture Montreal in Lower Canada. These attacks were expected to bring the colony to its knees and ensure a quick peace.

However, the four attacks on Upper Canada failed or were not even launched. Hull was besieged in Detroit and, fearing a massacre by Britain's Native American allies, surrendered the town and his entire army following the siege of Detroit. Dearborn and his army remained relatively inactive at Albany, New York and seemed to be in no hurry to attempt an invasion.

Van Rensselaer was also unable to launch any immediate attack on the Niagara Peninsula, lacking troops and supplies. Although he held the rank of Major General in the New York state militia, Van Rensselaer had not commanded troops in battle and was not a warrior, being considered the leading Federalist candidate for the governorship of New York. Possibly hoping to get Van Rensselaer out of the way, New York Governor Daniel Tompkins had put Van Rensselaer's name forward to command the army on the Niagara, and he officially took command on 13 July. Van Rensselaer secured the appointment of his second cousin, Colonel Solomon Van Rensselaer, as his aide-de-camp. Solomon van Rensselaer was an experienced soldier who had been wounded at the Battle of Fallen Timbers in 1794, and a valuable source of advice to the General.

Prelude

British moves
Major General Isaac Brock was both the civil Administrator of Upper Canada and Commander of the military forces there. He was an aggressive commander, and his successful capture of Detroit had won him praise, the reputation as the "saviour of Upper Canada" and a knighthood, the news of which would only reach Upper Canada after his death. However, his superior at Quebec, Lieutenant General Sir George Prevost, was of a more cautious bent, and the two clashed over strategy.

Brock had hastened back from Detroit, intending to cross the Niagara, defeat Van Rensselaer before he could be reinforced and occupy upper New York State. Prevost vetoed this plan, ordering Brock to behave more defensively. Not only was Prevost concerned by Brock's apparently rash actions, but he was aware that the British Government had revoked several Orders in Council which affected American merchant ships, and thus removed some of the stated causes of the war. He believed that peace negotiations might result and did not wish to prejudice any talks by taking offensive action. He opened negotiations with General Dearborn, and arranged local armistices. The United States government rejected Prevost's approach and ordered Dearborn "to proceed with the utmost vigor in your operations", after giving Prevost notice of the resumption of hostilities. However, it took several weeks for this correspondence to travel between Washington and the frontier.

While Brock had been at Detroit, Major General Sheaffe had been in command of the troops on the Niagara. Acting under Prevost's orders, Sheaffe had concluded an armistice with Colonel Van Rensselaer on 20 August and had even gone further than Prevost's orders by voluntarily restricting the movement of British troops and supplies. Brock returned to the Niagara on 22 August, to find the armistice in effect. The terms of the armistice permitted the use of the river by both powers as a common waterway and Brock could only watch as American reinforcements and supplies were moved to Van Rensselaer's army, without being able to take action to prevent it. The armistice ended on 8 September, by which time Van Rensselaer's army was considerably better supplied than it had been before.

American internal quarrels
Even with Hull's failure and Dearborn's inaction, Van Rensselaer's situation appeared strong. On 1 September, he had only 691 unpaid men fit for duty, but the arrival of reinforcements boosted his force considerably. In addition to his own force of around 6,000 regulars, volunteers, and militia, Van Rensselaer had Brigadier General Alexander Smyth's force of 1,700 regular soldiers under his command. However, Smyth, who was a regular officer although a lawyer by trade, steadfastly refused to obey Van Rensselaer's orders or respond to his summons. As soon as his force reached the frontier, Smyth deployed his force near Buffalo, New York, at the head of the Niagara River.

Van Rensselaer planned for the main force to cross the Niagara from Lewiston and take the heights near Queenston, while Smyth crossed the river near Fort Niagara and attacked Fort George from the rear. However, Smyth made no reply to Van Rensselaer's plan. When summoned to a council of officers in early October to plan the attack, Smyth did not respond, nor did he reply to a letter sent soon after. A direct order to arrive "with all possible dispatch" was also met with silence. Van Rensselaer, an amiable politician in a hurry to launch his attack, chose to proceed with the attack from Lewiston only, rather than bring Smyth before a court-martial and possibly delay the start of the battle. His aim was to establish a fortified bridgehead around Queenston, where he could maintain his army in winter quarters while planning for a campaign in the spring. Colonel Van Rensselaer had visited the British side under the escort of Brock's aide, Lieutenant Colonel John Macdonell, and had gained a fairly good idea of the lay of the land.

On 9 October, American sailors, artillerymen, and volunteers from the militia, commanded by Lieutenant Jesse Elliot, launched a successful boarding attack on the brigs Caledonia and Detroit, anchored near Fort Erie at the head of the Niagara River. Both brigs were captured, although Detroit subsequently ran aground and was set on fire to prevent it being recaptured. Brock feared this might presage an attack from Buffalo and galloped to Fort Erie. Although he soon realised that there was no immediate danger from Smyth in Buffalo, and returned to his headquarters in Niagara that night, it was mistakenly reported to Van Rensselaer that Brock had left in haste for Detroit, which Major General William Henry Harrison was attempting to retake. Van Rensselaer decided to launch an attack at 3 a.m. on 11 October, even though Colonel Van Rensselaer was ill.

On 10 October, Van Rensselaer sent orders to Smyth to march his brigade to Lewiston in preparation for the attack "with every possible dispatch." Smyth set out upon receipt of the letter. However, in foul weather, he chose a route to Lewiston that was so bad that abandoned wagons could be seen "sticking in the road." The same tempestuous weather drenched Van Rensselaer's troops as they stood and waited to embark. One of the lead boatmen, a Lieutenant Sims, rowed his boat away and deserted the army, taking with him most of the oars. By the time the oars could be replaced, the attack had to be postponed. Colonel Van Rensselaer set the second attempt for 13 October.

Smyth received word the attack had been postponed at 10 a.m. on 11 October. He then turned back to his camp at Black Rock, New York, near Buffalo, rather than press on to Lewiston. He wrote to Van Rensselaer on 12 October that his troops would be in condition to move out again on 14 October, a day after the postponed attack was to be launched.

Brock's preparations

Brock was aware of the failed attempt to cross the river on 11 October but was not certain this was not a mere demonstration to distract him from a major attack elsewhere. On 12 October, Major Thomas Evans (the Brigade Major at Fort George) crossed the Niagara River under a flag of truce to request an immediate exchange of prisoners taken in Elliot's raid on the British brigs three days before. He attempted to see Colonel Solomon Van Rensselaer but was told the Colonel was ill. Instead, he was met by a man who claimed to be General Stephen Van Rensselaer's secretary, Toock. Toock was probably Major John Lovett (Van Rensselaer's private military secretary) in disguise, and he repeatedly stated no exchange could be arranged until "the day after tomorrow."

Evans was struck by the repetition of this phrase and spotted several boats hidden under bushes along the shore. He deduced that a crossing was planned for 13 October, but when he returned to the British lines a council of officers responded to his statement with laughter and mockery. However, Brock took Evans aside and after a meeting was convinced of the possibility. That evening he dispatched several orders for the militia to assemble.

On 13 October, Brock was at his headquarters in Niagara. Major General Sheaffe was at Fort George nearby with the main British force. There were other British detachments at Queenston, Chippawa, and Fort Erie.

Battle

British dispositions

The village of Queenston consisted of a stone barracks and twenty houses each surrounded by gardens and peach orchards. Several farmhouses were scattered through the neighbouring fields and pastures. The village lay at the mouth of the gorge of the River Niagara. Immediately south of the village, the ground rose 300 feet (100 m) to Queenston Heights. The slope from the heights to the river bank was very steep but overgrown with shrubs and trees, making it fairly easy to climb. Lewiston was on the American side of the river, with the ground to its south rising to Lewiston Heights. The river was fast-flowing and 200 yards wide but was described as being little trouble to even an indifferent oarsman. In time of peace, there was a regular boat service between Queenston and Lewiston with permanent landing stages in both villages.

The British detachment at Queenston consisted of the grenadier company of the 49th Regiment of Foot (which Brock had formerly commanded) under Captain James Dennis, a flank company of the 2nd Regiment of York Militia (the "York Volunteers") under Captain George Chisholm, and a detachment of the 41st Regiment of Foot with a 3-pounder grasshopper cannon. The light company of the 49th under Captain John Williams was posted in huts on top of the heights. An 18-pounder gun and a mortar were mounted in a redan halfway up the Heights, and a 24-pounder gun and a carronade were sited in a barbette at Vrooman's Point, a mile north of the village, guarded by a company of the 5th Regiment of Lincoln Militia under Captain Samuel Hatt. Two more companies of York Militia under Captains Cameron and Heward were stationed at Brown's Point, three miles to the north. The remaining local militia of the 5th Lincoln Regiment were not on duty but could assemble at very short notice.

First American landing

The American forces involved were the 6th, 13th, and 23rd U.S. Regiments of Infantry, with detachments of U.S. Artillery serving as infantry. There were also the 16th, 17th, 18th, 19th, and 20th Regiments of New York Militia and a volunteer battalion of riflemen, totalling 900 regulars and 2,650 militia. Because the United States Army was being rapidly expanded, most of the regulars at Lewiston were recent recruits, and Van Rensselaer considered the militiamen's drill and discipline superior to that of the regulars. The Americans had twelve boats, each of which could carry thirty men, and two large boats which could carry eighty men and which were fitted with platforms on which field guns or wagons could be carried. A last-minute squabble over seniority and precedence led to the command of the first landing party being split. Colonel Van Rensselaer led the militia contingent and Lieutenant Colonel John Chrystie of the 13th U.S. Infantry led the regulars.

The Americans began crossing the river in thirteen boats at 4 a.m. on 13 October. Three boats, including Chrystie's, were swept downstream by the current. One landed lower down and the other two under Chrystie returned to the American side of the river. Ten minutes after they began the crossing, the remaining ten boats under Colonel van Rensselaer began landing at the village. A sentry noticed them and, rather than fire his musket to raise the alarm and thus warn the American troops that they had been spotted, ran to Dennis' headquarters. After waiting and observing the enemy landing build up for several minutes, Dennis' troops began firing rolling, accurate volleys into the Americans in the midst of their coming ashore, firing low so as to inflict debilitating wounds. Colonel Van Rensselaer was hit in the thigh by a musket ball as soon as he stepped out of his boat on the Canadian shore. As he tried to form up his troops, he was promptly hit five more times in the heel, thighs and calf, and though he survived, he spent most of the battle out of action, weak from loss of blood. Captain John E. Wool of the 13th U.S. Infantry took over and fought to retain the American foothold in Queenston.

Meanwhile, the British guns opened fire in the direction of the American landing stage at Lewiston, and the American guns (two 18-pounder guns in an earthwork named "Fort Gray" on Lewiston Heights, two 6-pounder field guns and two  mortars near the landing stage) opened fire on Queenston village. Dennis' troops were driven back into the village but kept firing from the shelter of the houses.

As the light grew, the British guns became more accurate. As a second wave of six American boats began to cross the river, the crews of three of them, including their two largest, one of which was carrying Lieutenant Colonel Chrystie, panicked as they came under fire. Chrystie's pilot turned the boat back for shore, despite Chrystie's efforts to restrain him. This later caused controversy when Captain Lawrence, commanding the next boat following, asserted Chrystie had ordered him to retreat, leading to accusations of cowardice. One of the four remaining boats was sunk by fire from a 3-pound grasshopper cannon and a trio of others, carrying Lieutenant Colonel John Fenwick (formerly the commandant at Fort Niagara) and 80 men, drifted downstream and landed in Hamilton Cove, a hollow about 800 yards downriver, where a detachment of York and Lincoln Militia quickly surrounded Fenwick's men. A blistering fire was opened upon the U.S. infantry; Fenwick was grievously wounded in the face by a pistol shot, also receiving musket balls in his thigh and right side - his cloak was riddled with nine additional balls. Their boats' hulls perforated with musket fire, and most of their comrades killed or wounded within minutes, all the other survivors of Fenwick's party quickly surrendered. Three men managed to escape in one boat, which sank on reaching the American side of the river. The last boat drifted within easy range of the gun at Vrooman's Point and its occupants surrendered.

Death of Isaac Brock
At Fort George, Brock had been awakened by the noise of the artillery at Queenston. As he considered this might only be a diversion, he ordered only a few detachments to move to Queenston but galloped there himself, accompanied by a few aides. He passed through the village as dawn broke, being cheered by the men of the 49th, many of whom knew him well, and moved up to the redan to gain a better view.

The 18-pounder cannon and the howitzer in the redan were causing great carnage amongst the American boats. Since coming ashore an hour-and-a-half earlier, the U.S. forces had been pinned down along the river. Prompted by Lieutenant Gansevoort of the U.S. Artillery, who knew the area well, the wounded Colonel Solomon Van Rensselaer ordered Captains Wool and Ogilvie to take a detachment upstream "and ascend the heights by the point of the rock, and storm the battery." The redan had very few troops guarding it, the light company of the 49th having been ordered from the heights into the town by Brock to join the fighting in the village in support of the grenadier company. Wool's troops attacked just after Brock arrived, forcing his small party and the artillerymen to flee into the village, after quickly spiking the guns. Brock sent a message to Major General Sheaffe at Fort George, ordering him to bring as many troops as possible to Queenston. He then resolved to recapture the redan immediately rather than wait for reinforcements.

Brock's charge was made by Dennis' and Williams' two companies of the 49th and two companies of militia. The assault was halted by heavy fire and as he noticed unwounded men dropping to the rear, Brock shouted angrily that "This is the first time I have ever seen the 49th turn their backs! Surely the heroes of Egmont will not tarnish their record!" At this rebuke, the ranks promptly closed up and were joined by two more companies of militia, those of Cameron and Heward. Brock saw that the militia supports were lagging behind at the foot of the hill and ordered one of his Provincial aides-de-camp, Lieutenant Colonel John Macdonell, to "Push on the York Volunteers" while he led his own party to the right, presumably intending to join his party with that of Williams' detachment who were beginning to make progress on that flank.

Brock was struck in the wrist of his sword arm by a musket ball but pressed home the attack he was directing. His height and energetic gestures, together with his officer's uniform and a gaudy sash given to him eight weeks earlier by Tecumseh after the siege of Detroit, made him a conspicuous target. He was shot down by an unknown American who stepped forward from a thicket and fired at a range of barely fifty yards. The ball struck Brock in the chest, killing him almost instantly. His body was carried from the field and secreted in a nearby house at the corner of Queenston Street and Partition Street, diagonally opposite that of Laura Secord.

Despite being a lawyer by trade with little military experience, Lieutenant Colonel Macdonell led a second attempt, together with Williams, to retake the redan. With Williams' men of the 49th starting from brush to the right of the line near the escarpment and Macdonell's anchoring the left, the force of between 70 and 80 men (more than half of whom were militia) advanced toward the redan. Wool had been reinforced by more troops who had just made their way up the path to the top of the Heights, and Macdonell faced some four hundred troops.

Despite the disadvantage in numbers as well as attacking a fixed position, Williams' and Macdonell's small force was driving the opposing force to the edge of the gorge on which the redan was situated, and seemed on the verge of success before the Americans were able to regroup and stand firm. The battle's momentum turned when a musket ball hit Macdonell's mount, causing it to rear and twist around, and another shot hit him in the small of the back, causing him to fall from the horse. He was removed from the battlefield but succumbed to his injuries early the next day. Captain Williams was laid low by a wound to the head, and Dennis by a severe wound to the thigh (although he continued to lead his detachment throughout the action). Carrying Macdonnell and the body of Brock, the British fell back through Queenston to Durham's Farm a mile north near Vrooman's Point.

According to legend, Brock's last words were "Push on, brave York Volunteers", but this is very unlikely, since Brock was not with them when he fell. Moreover, the wound's location (as seen on his coat, which is on display at the Canadian War Museum) suggests Brock died almost instantly, without time to speak. According to historian J. Mackay Hitsman, Brock's earlier command to push on the York Volunteers, who had just arrived from Queenston, was transformed into the later legend.

Movements, 10 a.m. to 2 p.m.
By 10 a.m., the Americans were opposed only by the 24-pounder at Vrooman's Point which was firing at the American boats at very long range. The Americans were able to push several hundred fresh troops and a 6-pounder field gun across the river. They unspiked the 18-pounder in the redan and used it to fire into Queenston village, but it had a limited field of fire away from the river. Some American soldiers entered Queenston village and looted some houses. They also rescued Lieutenant Colonel Fenwick and other survivors from his party, but did not attempt to drive Dennis from his position near Vrooman's Point.

Lieutenant Colonel Chrystie briefly took charge of the troops on the Canadian side but returned to Lewiston to collect reinforcements and entrenching tools. At about noon, General van Rensselaer and Chrystie crossed to the Canadian side of the river. They ordered the position on Queenston Heights to be fortified. Lieutenant Joseph Gilbert Totten of the U.S. Engineers traced out the position of the proposed fortifications. Van Rensselaer appointed Lieutenant Colonel Winfield Scott of the 2nd U.S. Artillery to take command of the regulars on Queenston Heights. Brigadier General William Wadsworth, who was nominally present as a volunteer and who waived his right to overall command, took charge of the militia. There were few complete formed units; there was only a collection of unorganised detachments, some without their officers. Likewise some officers had crossed but their men had not followed them. Little more than a thousand of General Van Rensselaer's men had crossed the Niagara River.

Meanwhile, British reinforcements had begun to arrive from Fort George. A detachment of the Royal Artillery (a "car brigade", with draught horses and drivers provided by Canadian farmers and militia) under Captain William Holcroft with two 6-pounder guns moved into Queenston village, supported by a company of the 41st under Captain Derenzy. Militia Captain Alexander Hamilton guided them to a firing position in the courtyard of Hamilton's house. When they opened fire at 1 p.m., it once again became hazardous for the American boats to attempt to cross the river. Two American boats and a scow were sunk, and shrapnel fire several times silenced the American batteries in Lewiston.

At the same time, 300 Mohawk warriors under Captains John Norton and John Brant climbed up to the top of the heights and suddenly fell on Scott's outposts. None were killed, and the Mohawk force was driven back into some woods, but the Americans' spirits were badly affected by their fear of the natives. Warcries could be clearly heard in Lewiston, and militia waiting there to cross the river refused to do so.

Sheaffe's attack
Sheaffe arrived at Queenston at 2 p.m. and took charge of the British troops. He ordered yet more reinforcements to join him, and when they had done so, he led his force on a  detour to the Heights, shielding them from the American artillery. Here, he was joined by another column of reinforcements from Chippawa under Captain Richard Bullock of the 41st. In all, he commanded over 800 men. In addition to the remnants of the force which had been engaged under Brock in the morning, he had five companies of the 41st and seven of militia (including Captain Runchey's Company of Coloured Men), with two 3-pounder guns, belonging to Swayze's Provincial Artillery (a militia unit) but commanded by Lieutenant Crowther of the 41st.

General Van Rensselaer determined at this point to re-cross to Lewiston to push forward reinforcements and munitions. Refugees and stragglers crowded into his boat and nearly capsized it. In Lewiston, he found that the troops had dissolved into a disorderly crowd and was unable to cajole any more of the militia into crossing the river. He then tried to induce the civilian boatmen to cross the river and retrieve his soldiers from Canada, but they refused even that. The General reported the next day that, "...to my utter astonishment, I found that at the very moment when complete victory was in our hands, the ardor of the unengaged troops had entirely subsided.  I rode in all directions – urged men by every consideration to pass over – but in vain." He sent a message to Brigadier General Wadsworth which left the decision whether to stand and fight or withdraw across the Niagara to him, promising to send boats if the decision was made to withdraw.

As Sheaffe's force began to advance, Scott and Wadsworth received Van Rensselaer's message. At this point, according to Scott, the effective American force on the heights consisted of 125 regular infantry, 14 artillerymen and 296 militiamen. The Americans decided to abandon their incomplete field works and withdraw. Scott fell back to the top of the heights where he attempted to throw up a barricade of fence rails and brushwood to cover the evacuation with his regulars. He placed the 6-pounder gun in front of the line, and posted some riflemen on the right among the huts formerly occupied by the light company of the 49th.

Sheaffe took his time forming his men up and preparing them for battle and attacked at 4 p.m., twelve hours after Van Rensselaer launched his assault. The first attack was made by the light company of the 41st with 35 militia and some Native Americans against the riflemen on Scott's right. After firing a volley, they charged with the bayonet, forcing the riflemen to give way in confusion. Sheaffe immediately ordered a general advance, and the entire British line fired a volley, raised the Indian war-whoop and charged. The American militia, hearing the Mohawk war-cries and believing themselves doomed, retreated en masse and without orders. Cursing the men who would not cross the river, General Wadsworth surrendered at the edge of the precipice with 300 men. Scott, Totten and some others scrambled down the steep bank to the edge of the river. With no boats arriving to evacuate his men and with the Mohawk warriors furious over the deaths of two chiefs, Scott feared a massacre and surrendered to the British. The first two officers who tried to surrender were killed by Native Americans, and after Scott had personally waved a white flag (actually Totten's white cravat), excited Natives continued to fire from the heights into the crowd of Americans on the river bank below for several minutes.

Once the surrender was made, Scott was shocked to see 500 militiamen, who had been hiding around the heights, emerging to surrender also.

Casualties
The British official casualty return gave 14 killed, 77 wounded, and 21 missing, with the loss of Norton's Native Americans not included. Historian Robert Malcomson has demonstrated this computation to be in error and shows that the British and Canadian losses were 16 killed, 83 wounded, and 21 captured, with a further 5 killed, 2 wounded, and 1 captured among the Native American contingent. This gives a total loss of 21 killed, 85 wounded, and 22 captured. Among the wounded Canadians was James Secord, husband of Laura Secord.

The number of Americans killed in the battle has been variously estimated at 60, 90, and 100. 82 severely wounded Americans were evacuated across the Niagara before the surrender, of whom 2 soon died. 955 Americans were initially captured by the British, including 120 severely wounded officers and men. This was more than the hospital at Niagara could accommodate, so some of them had to be cared for in the court house or in nearby churches. These were only the men who were badly injured enough to require hospitalization: the numbers of the walking wounded, who were seen by the British surgeons and then kept with the other prisoners, have not been recorded. Of the severely wounded prisoners, 30 soon died, so by the time a full report on the prisoners was issued on 15 October, there were 19 officers and 417 enlisted men of the U.S. regulars and 54 officers and 435 other ranks of the New York Militia. The 80 surviving wounded in the American hospital and the 90 surviving wounded prisoners were presumably the basis for General Van Rensselaer's statement, in a letter to Dearborn on 20 October, that "the aggregate" of his information would indicate that 170 Americans had been wounded in the battle. This gives total American casualties of 60–100 killed, 80 wounded, 90 wounded prisoners and 835 other prisoners. 6 officers (4 regular and 2 militia) were among the killed; 11 officers (6 regular and 5 militia) were among the wounded who escaped capture and 8 officers (4 regular and 4 militia) were among the wounded prisoners. Those captured included Brigadier General William Wadsworth of the New York Militia, Lieutenant Colonel Scott and four other lieutenant colonels. A 6-pounder gun and the colours of a New York Militia regiment were also captured.

Aftermath
Sheaffe immediately proposed a temporary truce and invited Van Rensselaer to send surgeons to assist in treating the wounded. Having assented, General Van Rensselaer resigned immediately after the battle and was succeeded as senior officer on the Niagara by Alexander Smyth, the officer whose insolence had badly injured the invasion attempt. Smyth still had his regulars at Buffalo but refused to launch an attack until he had 3,000 men under his command. He launched a successful raid to prepare the ground for a full-scale invasion at the Battle of Frenchman's Creek but then bungled two attempts to cross the river near Fort Erie and drew the loathing of his soldiers. Universally castigated for his refusal to attack and with rumours of mutiny in the air, Smyth slipped away to his home in Virginia rather than remain at his post.

At Albany, the defeat of Van Rensselaer only increased Henry Dearborn's reluctance to act. With two armies already defeated, Dearborn was not keen on leading the third. He led a half-hearted advance as far as Odelltown, where his militia refused to proceed further. After his regulars were easily repulsed by the garrison of an outpost at Lacolle Mills, Dearborn retired to American territory. He would be replaced the following year with only minor successes to his credit.

The question of who was to blame for the defeat was one that was never resolved. Stephen Van Rensselaer's popularity remained high enough that he was able to make an unsuccessful attempt to unseat Daniel Tompkins as Governor of New York, and he later served in the United States House of Representatives. General John Armstrong, Jr., the Secretary of War for much of the war, pinned the blame on General Van Rensselaer in his Notices of the War of 1812, published after the war. This provoked an indignant response from Solomon Van Rensselaer, who compared Armstrong to Benedict Arnold and laid the blame squarely on Lieutenant Colonel Chrystie (who had died of natural causes in July 1813), who he accused of cowardice and said "to his failure may mainly be attributed all our disasters."

The loss of Major General Brock was nevertheless a major blow to the British. Brock had inspired his own troops and the militia and civilian authorities in Upper Canada by his blustering confidence and activity. Sheaffe, his successor, received a baronetcy for his part in the victory but could not command the same respect. He was already known to many of the troops in Upper Canada as a harsh disciplinarian. His success where Brock had rashly sacrificed himself could not help him escape censure for not having followed up the victory at Queenston Heights with an attack on Fort Niagara (which had been left virtually evacuated by its garrison after a bombardment from British batteries that afternoon). The following April, he was defeated by a numerically superior American force at the Battle of York. Although his decision to retreat with his few regulars was accepted by his superiors (and his American opponents) to be correct in military terms, it left the local militia, the Assembly of Upper Canada and the population of York feeling abandoned and aggrieved. He was relieved of his appointments in Upper Canada.

Legacy

A 56-metre (185 ft) column atop Queenston Heights in Queenston, Ontario, Canada, known as Brock's Monument, commemorates the battle as well as the memory of the British General who died there.

The song "MacDonell on the Heights", by Stan Rogers, commemorates the role of John MacDonell in the battle.

The Battle Honour "Queenstown" [sic] was awarded to two British regiments in the aftermath of the war: the 41st Regiment of Foot and 49th Regiment of Foot, whose successor units in the modern British Army are the Royal Welsh and the Rifles Regiments.

In the Canadian Army, the Lincoln and Welland Regiment, the 56th Field Artillery Regiment, RCA, the Queen's York Rangers, the Royal Hamilton Light Infantry, and the Lorne Scots perpetuate the history and heritage of Canadian militia units that took part in the battle. These regiments also carry the QUEENSTON Battle Honour.

The Ontario Highway 405 that connects the Lewiston–Queenston Bridge to the Queen Elizabeth Way is named the General Brock Parkway.

Many songs have been written about the battle. In 1959, as an answer to "The Battle of New Orleans", then a hit record by Johnny Horton, Toronto radio station CHUM recorded "The Battle of Queenston Heights", with DJ Mike Darow on lead vocals. Credited to "Mike Darow and the CHUMs", the number became a regional hit in its own right, reaching the top twenty on CHUM's own chart.

Multiple streets, avenues, roads, and a university in Ontario are named after Major General Brock, as is the city of Brockville in the province.

Notes

References

External links

 Van Rensselaer's explanation to Gen. Dearborn as to why the Americans lost the Battle of Queenston
 An Historic Account of the Battle of Queenston Heights
 Brock's Monument – Summary of the battle, information about the battlefield and tours.
 Battle summary, map, photos of area
 Downloadable summary of Battle from Historic Lewiston, NY
 Art works in the collection of the Niagara Falls Public Library
 Poems of the Battle of Queenston Heights from the Niagara Falls Poetry Project
 PBS Documentary includes a chapter on this battle.

Conflicts in 1812
1812 in Upper Canada
Queenston Heights
Niagara-on-the-Lake
History of the Regional Municipality of Niagara
October 1812 events
Queenston Heights